Aleksandr Yefimovich Razumny (1 May 1891 – 16 November 1972) was a Russian and Soviet film director and screenwriter.
He was a graduate of the Grekov Odessa Art school in 1914.

Filmography
director
 The Life and Death of Lieutenant Schmidt (Жизнь и смерть лейтенанта Шмидта) (1917)
 The Fourth Wife (Четвертая жена) (1918)
 Uprising (Восстание) (1918)
 Flavia Tessini (Флавия Тессини) (1918)
 The Last Meeting (Последняя встреча) (1919)
 White and Black (Белое и черное) (1919)
 Comrade Abram (Товарищ Абрам) (1919)
 Two Poles (Два поляка) (1920)
 Mother (Мать) (1920)
 Brigade Commander Ivanov (Комбриг Иванов) (1923)
 The Gribushin Family (Семья Грибушиных) (1923)
 Outlaws of Batka Knysh (Банда батьки Кныша) (1924)
 Valley of Tears (Долина слез) (1924)
 The Hard Years (Тяжелые годы) (1925)
 Superfluous People (Лишние люди) (1926)
 Pique Dame (Пиковая дама) (1927)
 Prince or Clown (Принц или клоун) (1928)
 The Plight of the Island (Бегствующий остров) (19)
 Kara-bugaz (Кара-Бугаз) (1935)
 Personal File (Личное дело) (1939)
 Timur and His Team (Тимур и его команда) (1940)
 Timur's Oath (Клятва Тимура) (1942)
 Miklukho-Maklai (Миклухо-Маклай) (1947)
 The Adventures of Corporal Kolchekov (Случай с ефрейтором Кочетковым) (1955)
 Homecoming (Игнотас вернулся домой) (1957)
 Sergeant Fetisov (Сержант Фетисов) (1961)

References

External links

Soviet film directors
Soviet screenwriters
Male screenwriters
Silent film directors
Burials at Novodevichy Cemetery
1891 births
1972 deaths
20th-century screenwriters